Josefine is a given name. Notable people with the name include:

Josefine Balluck (1908–1984), Austrian actress with dwarfism, played a Munchkin in "The Wizard of Oz"
Josefine Cronholm (born 1971), Swedish jazz vocalist
Josefine Engström, Swedish ski-orienteering competitor and World Champion
Josefine Lindstrand, Swedish singer who was born in Örebro in 1981
Josefine Öqvist (born 1983), female footballer for Linköpings FC and the Swedish national team
Josefine Preuß (born 1986), German actress
Josefine Ridell (born 1997), Swedish singer in the 2010 Junior Eurovision Song Contest

In fiction
 Josefine “Pepi” Mutzenbacher (1852–1904), the heroine of an eponymous erotic novel from 1906

See also
Josephine

de:Josefine
sv:Josefine